Daingean (or ), formerly Philipstown, named after King Philip II of Spain, is a small town in east County Offaly, Ireland. It is situated midway between the towns of Tullamore and Edenderry on the R402 regional road. The town of Daingean had a population, as of the 2016 census, of 1,077. It is the principal town of the Daingean Catholic Parish. The other main poles of this parish are Ballycommon, Kilclonfert and Cappincur.

History
Daingean was originally named Philipstown in 1556 when it was established as the county town of the newly-shired King's County that was planted by Queen Mary I. The town and the county was so named after her husband and co-monarch Philip who was the titular King of Ireland. From his wife's death in 1558 he resigned, and was soon afterwards crowned as Philip II of Spain.

The town was once the seat of the O'Connor clan, who were chieftains of the surrounding area of Offaly. Its current name of Daingean, from Daingean Ua bhFáilghe, means fortress of the Uí Fáilghe clan, a name that it derived from the medieval island fortress of O'Connor Faly. In 1883, Tullamore replaced Daingean as the focal point of the county, being on a railway line. As a result, Philipstown was demoted from county town to village and as a result lost most of its political status. With the foundation of the Free State in 1922, the village was renamed Daingean, at the same time as County Offaly replaced the old style of King's County.

In the 1850s the jail (then known as Philipstown Gaol) was used to detain people who were convicted and sentenced to transportation to Australia while they waited for a ship to transport them. Many of them died in the jail after spending several years waiting to be transported.

Daingean has a number of important public buildings, including a courthouse whose design is locally attributed to James Gandon. Other large buildings include a children's reformatory (mentioned in the Ryan Report), the remnants of a military barracks (known as the footbarrack) giving its name to the bridge leading out of the town towards Tullamore - the footbarrack bridge.  There are the remnants of an Anglican church and a functioning Roman Catholic church. Of these buildings all can still be seen in various states but few are still used for their original functions within the village. The courthouse has functioned as a town hall, dance hall and bingo hall, having been renovated in the 1980s by the state training body AnCO, using local labour.

A bog body, given the name Old Croghan Man, was found near Daingean in 2004 and featured on the BBC Two Timewatch programme in January 2006.

A book called From the Quiet Annals of Daingean was written and published by John Kearney of Daingean in December 2006.

While there is a local farming economy, many of the people from Daingean work in Tullamore or commute further afield. Daingean is surrounded by the Bog of Allen and Bord Na Mona (BnM) remains a local employer, however the number employed is much reduced from the heyday when local people made a living working at the briquette factory and on the bog. The ESB power station at nearby Rhode was also a significant employer before its closure.  Even in the period of high unemployment in the 1980s, the ESB and BnM trained local men in their apprenticeship programmes.

Publican Matt Farrell was murdered in the town on 1 April 2009. A €10,000 reward was offered for information when the crime had not been solved several months later.

Tourism
The Grand Canal, which links Dublin and the River Shannon, passes through the village. The village has an 18-hole golf course, Castle Barna Golf Club. Daingean is also home to Grand Canal Adventures who provide kayaking, water zorbing, bicycle hire and other water sports and leisure activities on the canal.

Cultural events
The Daingean Homecoming Festival is a week-long event hosted at the beginning of each August. The festival includes a raft race on the Grand Canal, a parade, traditional threshing, a karaoke competition and a children's day. During the Daingean Homecoming Festival, a "festival queen" is selected by a panel of judges. On the Friday night of the festival, the Tullamore Harriers Athletic Club organise a 5 km road race. This race makes four loops of the town on a circuit including Main Street, Church Street, Canal View, and Circular Road. The race has previously seen over 100 runners taking part.

Transport

The regional R402 road forms the principal street of Daingean known as Main Street. This road links Enfield, Edenderry, Daingean, Ballinagar and (through the R420) Tullamore.

Daingean is served by a Bus Éireann commuter bus service through route 120.

People
Mrs. Eckleston of Philipstown was stated to be 143 when she died (1548–1691).
Patrick Dunne (1818–1900), a Roman Catholic priest who ministered in Australia, was born in Philipstown.
Lord Charles Beresford (1846-1919), British admiral and politician; son of the 4th Marquess of Waterton, born in Philipstown.
Joe Connor (1877-1934), an Irish international footballer who played for West Bromwich Albion, Arsenal and Fulham among others, was born in Philipstown.
Kevin Kilmurray, former Offaly footballer and manager
Geraldine O'Neill is an internationally published author living in Daingean since 1991 though originally from Scotland. She has strong links to Daingean as her mother, Bridget O'Reilly was born and brought up in Daingean, and Geraldine was also a teacher in Daingean National School.  She primarily writes historical fiction novels, many of which are set in County Offaly and feature Daingean and other places such as Tullamore and Edenderry.

See also
List of towns and villages in Ireland

References

Towns and villages in County Offaly